Mark Johnson (born in 1957 in Parkdale, Oregon) is an American politician and a Republican former member of the Oregon House of Representatives representing District 52 from 2011 until 2017.

Education
Johnson attended Whitworth College (now Whitworth University).

Resignation
On October 6, 2017, Johnson was named executive director of Oregon Business Industry, a business lobbying organization, and resigned his seat November 6, 2017.

Fired From Oregon Business and Industry
On April 11, 2018, Johnson was fired from Oregon Business and Industry because he made racist comments about a State Representative. He made comments denigrating Rep. Diego Hernandez "and his chain migration homeboys from the hood." According to an article in the Oregonian/Oregonlive Johnson's tenure was "plagued by turnover of senior staff, frayed relationships internally and externally, questions surrounding his executive and managerial skills, and the lack of a coherent strategy for members."

Elections
 2012 Johnson was unopposed for the May 15, 2012 Republican Primary, winning with 3,646 votes, and won the November 6, 2012 General election with 14,344 votes (51.6%) against Democratic nominee Peter Nordbye.
 2010 Challenging incumbent Democratic Representative Suzanne VanOrman for the District 52 seat, Johnson was unopposed for the May 18, 2010 Republican Primary, winning with 3,643 votes, and won the November 2, 2010 General election with 14,012 votes (56.5%) against Representative VanOrman.

References

External links
 Official page at the Oregon Legislative Assembly
 Campaign site
 

Date of birth missing (living people)
1957 births
Living people
Republican Party members of the Oregon House of Representatives
People from Hood River, Oregon
Whitworth University alumni
21st-century American politicians